Texas Tornado is a Junior A hockey team.

Texas Tornado may also refer to:

Texas Tornado (roller coaster), Wonderland amusement park, Amarillo, Texas
"Texas Tornado" (song), a 1995 song by Tracy Lawrence from the album I See It Now
Kerry Von Erich (1960–1993), professional wrestler also known as "The Texas Tornado"
Colin Edwards (born 1974), motorcycle racer also known as the "Texas Tornado"
 The Texas Tornado (1932 film), an American western film
 The Texas Tornado (1928 film), an American silent western film
Texas Tornado (album), the second solo album by Dough Sahm

See also
 Texas Tornados, a Tejano band
 Texas Tornados, Buddy magazine's annual Texas musician hall of fame roster since 1978
Texas Tornadoes, a semi-professional floorball team
 :Category:Tornadoes in Texas